Luis Enrique "Neco" Martínez Rodríguez, (born 11 July 1982) is a retired Colombian footballer who played as a goalkeeper. He is nicknamed "Neco" for the town of his birth.

Career 
Martínez was signed by newly promoted Turkish team Sakaryaspor in summer 2006, signing a three-year contract, before moving to Colombian club Once Caldas.

International career 
During a World Cup warm-up match between Poland and Colombia on May 30, 2006, he scored a remarkable goal, striking directly from a long distance over the head of the opposition goalkeeper, Tomasz Kuszczak.

After a three-year absence from the national team, he was called back by new coach Hernan Dario Gomez for an international friendly match against Bolivia on August 5, 2010.

He was the starting goalkeeper for the Colombia national team during the Copa America 2011, since the starting goalkeeper David Ospina was out with a facial injury after colliding with Hugo Rodallega days before the tournament. Martinez had a good start to the tournament, being the only goalkeeper to have a clean sheet on all three group games. In the quarterfinal match against Peru however he made two crucial mistakes which led to the two goals of Peru.

International goals 
Scores and results list Colombia's goal tally first.

Honours

Club 
Once Caldas
 Categoría Primera A (1): 2010-II
Atlético Nacional
 Categoría Primera A (3): 2013-I, 2013-II, 2014-I
 Copa Colombia (1): 2013
Individual
Toulon Tournament Best Goalkeeper: 2001

See also 
 List of goalscoring goalkeepers

References

External links 
 

1982 births
Living people
Association football goalkeepers
Colombian footballers
Colombia international footballers
Envigado F.C. players
Atlético Huila footballers
Independiente Santa Fe footballers
Sakaryaspor footballers
Manisaspor footballers
Once Caldas footballers
Atlético Nacional footballers
América de Cali footballers
Categoría Primera A players
Süper Lig players
Colombian expatriate footballers
Expatriate footballers in Costa Rica
Expatriate footballers in Turkey
2005 CONCACAF Gold Cup players
2003 FIFA Confederations Cup players
2011 Copa América players
Sportspeople from Antioquia Department